Paul Rübig (born 6 May 1953) is an Austrian politician who served as a Member of the European Parliament (MEP) from 1996 until 2019. He is a member of the Austrian People's Party, part of the European People's Party.

Rübig became a Member of the European Parliament on 25 January 1996, and was re-elected in 1996, 1999, 2004, 2009 and 2014. Hence, he was the longest-serving MEP from Austria. On 25 June 2013, Rübig was elected already for the second time in a European-wide vote as MEP of the Year for his outstanding commitment in the field of research and innovation.

Background
Born in 1953, Rübig attended the polytechnic institute for farm machinery design in Steyr, graduating in 1972. After his military service, he studied business administration, marketing and industrial engineering at the University of Linz (1972–78). He completed his studies there with a doctorate at the Institute for Auditing, Trusteeship and Accountancy in 1984. At the same time, he worked as a lifeguard, glider and skiing instructor.

He started his business career already in 1972, working in the family forging company with various general management appointments until 1996. During the course of his business career he founded companies in France, Germany and the United Kingdom.

Political career

In 1991, Rübig was selected as a candidate for the Austrian People's Party for the regional elections in Upper Austria. After having been elected, he instantly became Chairman of the then so-called EU Integration Committee. By facilitating the accession of Austria to the European Union in this period, he quickly gained significant expertise in EU related matters. After a very short period as MP, he became a Member of the European Parliament on 25 January 1996, at this time by decision of the Austrian Parliament. Since then, he was four times re-elected, namely in 1996, 1999, 2004 and 2009.

Convinced about the benefits of a functioning social partnership in Austria, he held various positions within the Austrian Federal Economic Chamber. From 1991 to 1996 he was board member of the Upper Austria Business Promotion Institute, from 1996 to 2000 Vice-President of the Upper Austria Chamber of Commerce, and from 2000 to 2005 Industry Vice-Chairman of the federal organization of the Austrian Chamber of Commerce.

Parliamentary Work
Rübig served as member of the Committee on Industry, Research and Energy, of the Committee on Budgetary Control and is a substitute member of the Committee on Budgets. As deputy chairman, he was a member of the Maghreb delegation, and furthermore active in the delegations to the EFTA countries and to the Arabic peninsula.

As one of the initiators of the WTO Steering Committee, Rübig held the position of the EPP small businesses spokesperson. Furthermore, he is the Treasurer of the Austrian EPP delegation in the European Parliament, Chairman of the Science and Technology Options Assessment (STOA) unit  and chairman of the Paneuropean Working Group in the European Parliament

Key policy objectives

Commitment for small and medium-sized enterprises 
Rübig strongly advocated in the European Parliament the interests of about 20.8 million small and medium sized enterprises (SME) in Europe. They create 85 percent of all new jobs, employ two thirds of all employees and mainly contribute to innovation and growth. Overcoming the global economic crisis, requires in his view a reduction of costs for SME, in particular for startup companies, significantly less red-tape, innovative SME tax regimes and more focus on independent and entrepreneurial thinking in school education.

In order to better promote his political ideas in the public debate, Rübig founded in May 2012 together with the Danish MEP Bendt Bendtsen and the Bulgarian MEP Nadezhda Neynsky the business organization of the European People's Party, SME Europe. In February 2013, the General Assembly decided to choose Rübig as the Honorary President of the organization. Since 2003, he is also the President of SME Global. Furthermore, between 1999 and 2000 he was elected President of the SME Circle of the EPP Parliamentary Group, from 2000 to 2001 Co-President of the SME Union and from 2001 to 2003 he held this same position alone as its President.

Reduction of roaming charges 

As responsible rapporteur in the industry committee and one of the most active supporters of the citizens initiative Europeans for Fair Roaming it was Rübig, as the key actor, who enforced the roaming rules at European level. Against massive opposition of the telecom industry, following his initiative, the costs for cross-border mobile calls, text messaging and mobile data transfers were gradually reduced. From 1 July 2013 on, mobile communication providers are only allowed to charge consumers following maximum prices: 24 cents (active calls), 7 cents (passive calls), 8 cents (text messages) and 45 cents (1 MB data packet). These ceilings will be again reduced before the summer 2014. Regardless of a further reduction of these ceilings in summer 2014, Rübig pushes now for a general abolition of roaming charges before the elections to the European Parliament in May 2014. In the New York Times he called upon the responsible Commissioner Neelie Kroes for swift and concrete implementation plans.

Science politician 

As key politician at European level in the field of science, Rübig advocated for a significant increase of research funding. In the negotiations for Horizon 2020, which will follow the 7th Research Framework Programme (FP7), he supports the restructuring of the available sources towards more funding for small and medium-sized enterprises. At the same time, he requests in the ongoing budget negotiations for the new Multiannual Financial Framework (MFF) an increase of means for growth generating measures in education, science and research. According to him, ultimately it always have been technological innovations that have shaped the history of mankind. Hence, today's investments into research, shape Europe's destiny of tomorrow.

Responsible and efficient use of tax money 
As member of the Budgetary Control Committee, Rübig stood for a responsible and efficient use of tax money. Instead of only one-sided increases of single budget items, he generally advocates to examine in detail the use of tax money on its efficacy, appropriateness and cost-effectiveness. Alone, if this is ensured, it is justified according to him to spend more money on single areas, otherwise we have to achieve more with less means.

Energy transition 

As expert on energy policies in the European Parliament, Rübig worked on a fundamental rethink in the energy policy of the European Union. He demands an effective and lasting support of renewable energies, a reduction of carbon dioxide emissions, as well as a significant increase of energy efficiency. According to him, reforms have to be designed in a way that energy prices remain affordable and that the population benefits from an increased security of supply. Instead of a system of sanctions, targeted incentives should motivate the population to actively engage in the transformation of energy policies. In contrary to many of his colleagues in the European Parliament, Rübig suggests not to support all forms of low carbon energies at the same level, but only the safest, most cost-efficient and cleanest energies. He justifies his refusal of dangerous nuclear energy with reference to the high security risks and the enormous costs in the life cycle of such a power plant (construction, operation, decommissioning, final storage).

Removal of global trade barriers 

As EPP spokesperson in the WTO steering committee of the European Parliament, Rübig advocated for a sustainable removal of global trade barriers. In his view, developing countries can only break out of the poverty trap by opening their economies to international trade and investments, whereas protectionist measures have the opposite effect. In this context, free-trade should be accompanied by measures to improve infrastructure, a better education system for young people, as well as a well-functioning administrative and judicial system. Furthermore, Rübig argues in favour of giving companies the possibility to actively participate in dispute settlement procedures of the World Trade Organization, instead of only giving this possibility to national governments. Altogether, such a system would lead to a much higher degree of legal security in international trade. In the debate about the possible Transatlantic Free Trade Agreement with the United States, he supports the initiative due to the positive effects for the global economic development. In case of an agreement until 2015, he expects 400,000 new jobs and on average a financial relief of 545 Euro for each household every year.

Europeanization of the political debate 
Rübig regularly criticizes that the public debates in the member states do not pay sufficiently attention to issues debated at European Union level. Hence, he asks for a Europeanization of news coverage in national newspapers and broadcasts. Furthermore, he also supports cross-border media projects and often speaks in academic debates all over Europe. In this context, Rübig was invited amongst others by the renowned College of Europe (CoE) and the French École nationale d’administration (ENA) in order to give public lectures.

Criticism
As a self declared expert in key issues about the internet, Rübing voted for restrictions of the net neutrality and is also jointly responsible for the legislative text. His opinion on this issue is mainly based on his thoughts that soon the internet will be overloaded, and emergency calls will be delayed due to increasing streaming traffic (like netflix etc.).

Handover of the Peace Light 
Since Austria joined the European Union (1995), Rübig initiated the tradition of bringing the Peace Light of Bethlehem to Strasbourg to hand the flame over to the Council of Europe, the European Parliament and the city itself.

Other activities 
 European Internet Foundation, Member 
 European Parliament Ceramics Forum (EPCF), Member
 European Parliament Gypsum Forum, Member
 European Parliament Intergroup on "Climate Change, Biodiversity and Sustainable Development" (CCBSD), Member
 Plasma Protein Therapeutics Association (PPTA), Member

Personal life 
Since 1980, Rübig has been married and father of an adult daughter and son.

Awards 
2015: Member of the European Parliament of the Year, Category:  Information and Communication Technology (ICT) 
2013: Member of the European Parliament of the Year, Category: Research and Innovation
2013: Honorary President of SME Europe
2008: Member of the European Parliament of the Year, Category: Research and Innovation
 2003: Grand Decoration of Honour in Gold for Services to the Republic of Austria

Publications 
 Mühlbacher, Hans / Rübig, Paul: Internationale Patent- und Lizenzpolitik, Marketingstudie 6. 1979.
 Rübig, Paul (ed.): Lizenzmarketing, Trauner Verlag, Herausgeber Kulhavy 1984.
 Kaspar, Achim / Rübig, Paul (eds.): Telekommunikation - Herausforderung für Österreich, Signum Verlag. 1997
 Kaspar, Achim / Rübig, Paul (eds.): Telekommunikation II, Signum Verlag. 1999
 Kaspar, Achim / Rübig, Paul (eds.): e-wwworld>2000, Linde Verlag. 2000
 Kaspar, Achim / Rübig, Paul (eds.): Telekommunikation IV. Sternzeit 2010, Linde Verlag 2006
 De Fouloy, Christian / Rübig, Paul: The way to a united Europe, Unicorn Verlag. 2004.

External links

References

1953 births
Living people
Austrian People's Party MEPs
MEPs for Austria 1996–1999
MEPs for Austria 1999–2004
MEPs for Austria 2004–2009
MEPs for Austria 2009–2014
MEPs for Austria 2014–2019